Joe Smyth is a British Professional boxer who competes in the Light Heavyweight division.

As an amateur Smyth was in the English team alongside other well-known boxers such as Amir Khan, James DeGale, Frankie Gavin, Steven Smith and Tony Jeffries.

Smyth turned pro in 2008 and in December 2010 it was announced that Smyth would be taking part in the Lightheavy Weights prizefighter competition at York Hall, Bethnal Green on 29 January 2011.

Alongside stablemate Eder Kurti, Joe Smyth is trained by Paul Reese at the Monster Gym in Cheshunt and is managed by Michael Helliet Management.

See also 
 Mayfair Sporting Club
 Michael Helliet Management
 Prizefighter series

References

English male boxers
Living people
1985 births
Light-heavyweight boxers